Michael Gargiulo may refer to:
 Michael Gargiulo (born 1976), convicted American serial killer
 Michael Gargiulo (journalist) (born 1960), American television news anchor